Raštani (Macedonian Cyrillic: Раштани) is a village  away from Bitola, which is the second-largest city in North Macedonia.

Demographics
Raštani is attested in the Ottoman defter of 1467/68 as a village in the vilayet of Manastir. The inhabitants attested primarily bore a mixture of Christian Albanian and Slavic anthroponyms, such as Rajko, son of Gjon.

As of the 2021 census, Raštani had 550 residents with the following ethnic composition:
Macedonians 530
Persons for whom data are taken from administrative sources 12
Albanians 4
Others 4

According to the 2002 census, the village had a total of 396 inhabitants. Ethnic groups in the village include:
Macedonians 391
Aromanians 3
Others 2

References

Villages in Bitola Municipality